The 2003 Canadian Grand Prix was a Formula One motor race held on 15 June 2003 at the Circuit Gilles Villeneuve.

Michael Schumacher took the win, despite nursing an ailing car home towards the end of the race, with the Williamses of Ralf Schumacher and Juan Pablo Montoya right behind him, and the Renault of Fernando Alonso not far behind them.

This was the fourth time that the Schumacher brothers had finished 1-2, having become the first siblings to do so at the 2001 Canadian Grand Prix.

Classification

Qualifying

Race

Championship standings after the race 

Drivers' Championship standings

Constructors' Championship standings

Note: Only the top five positions are included for both sets of standings.

References

Canadian Grand Prix
Canadian Grand Prix
2000s in Montreal
2003 in Quebec
Grand Prix
Grand Prix